Zhoukou (postal: Chowkow) is a prefecture-level city in eastern Henan province, China. It borders Zhumadian to the southwest, Xuchang and Luohe to the west, Kaifeng to the northwest, Shangqiu to the northeast, and the province of Anhui on all other sides. As of the 2020 census, its population was 9,026,015 inhabitants. However, as of the 2018 estimation, 1,601,300 lived in the built-up (or metro) made up of  Chuanhui district and the northern part of Shangshui county.

Administration
The prefecture-level city of Zhoukou administers 2 districts, 1 county-level city and 7 counties.
Chuanhui District
Huaiyang District
Xiangcheng City
Shenqiu County
Dancheng County
Luyi County
Taikang County
Fugou County
Xihua County
Shangshui County

Climate

History

For thousands of years, Chen (now at Huaiyang) had been the center of this area and a nationally well-known city. The ancient city site founded at Pingliangtai (near Huaiyang) is over 4600 years old, which is one of the oldest cities in China. According to the legend, Fu Xi, the first of the Three Sovereigns of ancient China, died in the city. During the Spring and Autumn period, Chen was the capital of Chen State and then annexed by Chu. Therefore, the area was usually referred to as "Chen Chu" in ancient times. The leaders of the first Chinese peasant uprising (the Dazexiang uprising) established the government at Chen.

The city's name "Zhoukou" is short for "Zhoujiakou", which literally means "Zhou's ferry". Located at the intersection of Jialu River and Shaying River, it started to develop as a river harbor of China's Inland Water Transport System in the early Ming dynasty. By the end of the 18th century, two towns along the rivers merged into one big town with several tens of thousand permanent residents. From the port, cargo could either be shipped south to the Yangtze River or north to the Yellow River. However, after the "sea ban" was canceled, sea transport began to play a major role on the trade between Jiangnan and North China, which diminished the utility of inland waterways. The cost of maintaining the river channels kept increasing because of the ever-rising river bed. The appearance of railways and modern roads in the early 20th century lead to a recession in the water transport business nearby. Finally, in the 1970s, a dam was built on the Shaying River, which cut the city's last waterway.

In 2000, the government of the Zhoukou prefecture-level city was founded. The old county-level city and its suburban area became Chuanhui District.

Economy
Zhoukou is a major agricultural producer in the province of Henan. Its economy is mainly based on the trade of agricultural products, such as grain, cotton, oil, meat and tobacco. In particular, Zhoukou is famous for the skin of the Huai Goat, a local breed of goat.

Transportation
Railways
 Luofu Railway (Luohe-Fuyang)

Expressways
 Nanluo Expressway (Nanjing-Luoyang)
 Shangzhou Expressway (Shangqiu-Zhoukou)
 Daguang Expressway (Daqing-Guangzhou)
 Yongdeng Expressway (Yongcheng-Dengfeng)

Highways
 China National Highway 311 (G311)
 China National Highway 106 (G106)

Education
Universities and Colleges
 Zhoukou Normal University
 Zhoukou Vocational College of Science and Technology
 Zhoukou Institute of Education
 Zhoukou Polytechnic

Schools
 Zhoukou No.7 Middle School
 Huaiyang High School
 Zhoukou First High School
 High School of Fugou County
 Xiangcheng First High School
 Shangshui First High School

Notable people
 Laozi (philosopher and central figure in Taoism)
 Wu Guang (leader of the Dazexiang uprising)
 Yuan Shikai (politician)
 Ji Hongchang (general)
 Yue Wenhai (governor)
 Shuping Wang (HIV researcher)
 Wei Rui (sanshou fighter and professional kickboxer)
 Zhang Zhilei (professional heavyweight boxer)
 Jia Aoqi (sanshou fighter and professional kickboxer)
 Xu Jiayin (Chinese businessman and founder of Evergrande Group)

Sister cities
  Petropavl (Petropavlovsk), Kazakhstan
  Taió, Santa Catarina, Brazil

References

External links

 Zhoukou Municipal Bureau of Culture, Radio, Television and Tourism （Chinese Language Home Page）

 Chuanhui District Government（Chinese Language Home Page）

Government website of Zhoukou (in Simplified Chinese)

 
Cities in Henan
Prefecture-level divisions of Henan